Ventan Constantine Yablonski (March 4, 1923 – March 1, 2008) was an American football fullback who played four seasons with the Chicago Cardinals of the National Football League. He was drafted by the Chicago Cardinals in the twelfth round of the 1946 NFL Draft. He first enrolled at Fordham University before transferring to Columbia University. He attended Worcester Classical High School in Worcester, Massachusetts.

References

External links
Just Sports Stats

1923 births
2008 deaths
Players of American football from Worcester, Massachusetts
American football fullbacks
Fordham Rams football players
Columbia Lions football players
Chicago Cardinals players